Thomas McCabe (28 April 1954 – 19 April 2015) was a Scottish politician who served as Minister for Parliament from 1999 to 2001 and Minister for Finance and Public Service Reform from 2004 to 2007. A member of the Scottish Labour Party, he was Member of the Scottish Parliament (MSP) for the Hamilton South constituency from 1999 to 2011.

Background
McCabe was educated at St. Martin's Secondary School, Hamilton, and obtained a Diploma in Public Sector Management from Bell College of Technology, Hamilton.

He worked for Hoover plc (Cambuslang) from 1974 to 1993, and then in social work with Strathclyde Regional Council and North Lanarkshire Council. He was elected to serve as a councillor for Hamilton District Council and became its leader, then served as the first leader of South Lanarkshire Council when it was created in 1996 after a reform of local government.

Member of the Scottish Parliament

McCabe was elected to the Scottish Parliament for Hamilton South in 1999. As this was the first constituency to declare its results, he was the first ever MSP to be elected.

He was first appointed Minister for Parliament in the Scottish Executive from 1999 to 2001. Following Jack McConnell's appointment as First Minister he was out of office until after the 2003 Scottish Parliament election, when he returned as Deputy Minister for Health and Community Care. In October 2004 he was promoted to Minister for Finance and Public Service Reform in place of Andy Kerr.

In March 2005 he set up the AEWG (Adult Entertainment Working Group), the Scottish advisory body set up within the Scottish Executive to investigate the legislative issues involved in the current proposed lapdancing ban in Scotland. The ban is currently opposed by such figures as Veronica Deneuve and the union group IUSW (the International Union of Sex Workers) a member of the GMB union.

McCabe was one of several Labour casualties following the elections on 5 May 2011, losing his seat to Christina McKelvie of the SNP in the newly formed Hamilton, Larkhall and Stonehouse constituency.

Personal life
McCabe previously had a relationship with former Labour spin-doctor and journalist Lorraine Davidson.

McCabe died from cancer in April 2015, after a period of illness. A new residential street in Hamilton was named in his honour two years after his death.

References

External links 
 

|-

|-

|-

1954 births
2015 deaths
Members of the Scottish Parliament 1999–2003
Members of the Scottish Parliament 2003–2007
Members of the Scottish Parliament 2007–2011
Labour MSPs
Scottish Labour councillors
Councillors in South Lanarkshire
Politicians from Hamilton, South Lanarkshire
Finance ministers of Scotland
Leaders of local authorities of Scotland